Anomoporia bombycina is a species of fungi belonging to the family Fomitopsidaceae.

It is native to Europe and Northern America.

References

Fomitopsidaceae